Paciotti is an Italian surname. Notable people with the surname include:

Cesare Paciotti (born 1958), Italian shoe designer
Elena Ornella Paciotti (born 1941), Italian politician and magistrate
Larry Paciotti (born 1959), American director

Italian-language surnames